The effects of Hurricane Katrina in Alabama were damaging and deadly. On August 29, Hurricane Katrina made two landfalls in Louisiana and Mississippi. Katrina caused many impacts due to its large wind field across the southeast, including places like Alabama.

Background 

On August 23, Tropical Depression Twleve formed over the southeastern Bahamas. By the morning of August 24, it had strengthened into Tropical Storm Katrina. It then proceeded to become a Category 1 hurricane two hours before making landfall in South Florida on August 25. It weakened over land while moving over southern Florida, but it soon restrengthened after getting into the Gulf of Mexico. On August 27, it strengthened into a Category 3 hurricane, becoming the season's third major hurricane. It then went through an eyewall replacement cycle, weakening the storm a little but causing the hurricane to grow much larger. Once it was over, Katrina got over the waters in the unusually warm Loop Current, causing it to rapidly intensify and reach Category 5 strength in just nine hours, during the morning of August 28. It then went through yet another eyewall replacement cycle, weakening into a Category 3 hurricane.

It weakened into a tropical depression near Clarksville, Tennessee, and later got absorbed by a cold front in the Great Lakes region.

Preparations 
On August 27, at 21:00 UTC, a hurricane watch was issued for the entire Alabama coastline. By August 28, at 3:00 UTC, this was upgraded to a hurricane warning. However, on August 29, at 21:00 UTC, it was downgraded to a tropical storm warning, and the warning was later discontinued on August 30, at 3:00 UTC.

Impacts 
Four tornadoes formed in Central Alabama - two EF0s and two EF1s. These tornadoes caused damage to trees and multiple mobile homes. On Dauphin Island, a storm surge of  moved ashore, destroying over 350 houses. Only 50 have since been rebuilt.In Mobile, a storm surge of  moved ashore, while in Bayou La Batre, a storm surge of 12 - 14 feet was pushed ashore. As a result of the storm surge, an oil rig under construction along the Mobile River was dislodged, sending it down the river where it struck the Cochrane Bridge. Another offshore oil rig washed up on the beaches of Dauphin Island. Two indirect deaths were reported after a fatal car accident during the storm. Part of Battleship Parkway, or "The Causeway", which connects parts of Mobile Bay together, collapsed, causing a temporary closure. Much of Alabama west of Interstate 65 received  of rain. Over 656,000 customers in Alabama lost power, causing it to have, at the time, the second most power outages for a storm in Alabama history behind only Hurricane Ivan.

Aftermath 
As a result of the flooding in Mobile, a curfew from dusk to dawn was implemented.Around a week after Katrina hit Alabama, FEMA approved 5.2$ million into disaster aid to over 3,000 households in Alabama. Almost 550 truckloads with of supplies also arrived in Alabama from logistical centers across the southeast.

References

2005 in Alabama
Hurricane Katrina